The Novel of Werther (French: Le Roman de Werther) is a 1938 French historical drama film directed by Max Ophüls and starring Pierre Richard-Willm, Annie Vernay and Jean Galland. It is based on the 1774 novel The Sorrows of Young Werther by Goethe.

The film was made by Nero Film, a company run by German exiles who had left following the Nazi rise to power.

Cast
Pierre Richard-Willm as Werther
Annie Vernay as Charlotte
Jean Galland as Albert
Paulette Pax as Aunt Emma
Jean Périer as President
Edmond Beauchamp as murderer
Georges Bever as chamberlain
 as portraitist
 as Werther's colleague
 as the right one
Henri Guisol as Schertz, the clerk
Roger Legris as Franz, valet
 as little Gustave
Maurice Schutz as le sonneur
Léonce Corne asle majordome
Philippe Richard as Grand Duke
Charles Nossent as le cocher
Léon Larive as comedian
Georges Vitray as bailiff
 as girl
Henri Beaulieu
Henri Darbrey

Robert Rollis

References

External links

1930s historical drama films
French historical drama films
French black-and-white films
1938 drama films
Films directed by Max Ophüls
Films set in the 1770s
Films set in Germany
Films about suicide
Films based on German novels
Films based on works by Johann Wolfgang von Goethe
Works based on The Sorrows of Young Werther
Films scored by Paul Dessau
Films produced by Seymour Nebenzal
1930s French films